The term Yugoslav Muslims may refer to

 Yugoslav Muslims in terms of ethnicity: south-Slavic Muslims in former Yugoslavia
 in terms of religion: all adherents of Islam in former Yugoslavia
 in terms of political history: members of Yugoslav Muslim Organization (1919–1941)

See also
 Muslims (disambiguation)